Counterfort may refer to:

A Buttress
A defensive fortification, such as constructed by a besieging force, see Sconce (fortification)